Baumanskaya is a station on the Arbatsko-Pokrovskaya Line of the Moscow Metro, named after the revolutionary Nikolai Bauman. It was designed by Boris Iofan and Yury Zenkevich and opened in 1944. The Art Deco design features white marble pylons with rounded corners, projecting, fluted piers faced with red ceramic tile, and decorative ventilation grilles. In the bays between each set of piers are bronze sculptures by V.A. Andreev depicting Russian soldiers and workers of the home front during World War II. At the end of the platform is a mosaic portrait of Vladimir Lenin. This station is very busy, as one of the biggest Moscow institutes (Moscow State Technical University) is located not far away.

The station was closed in 2015 for repairs, maintenance and escalator shaft replacement. The escalators at Baumanskaya were the oldest on the network, having operated non-stop since 1944. They were the last H-series escalators in operation on the whole network.

Passenger traffic

Baumanskaya is the second busiest station in Moscow Metro.
The facts:
 There are at least 3 major universities near the station: Bauman Moscow State Technical University main and secondary buildings Moscow State University of Civil Engineering and Moscow State Academy of Law.
 Specific configuration of central hall like garmon (Russian accordion) before the escalator, where some passengers try to short jump queue.
 Most passengers prefer Baumanskaya to other station if they would get to the area which is at half-way between Baumanskaya and another station even if causes additional transfer or even best accessible by ground transport.
 The escalators here were the oldest working in Moscow Metro and the entire world. Their replacement began on 8 February 2015 and was completed on 24 December 2015.

Inscription

A cryptic inscription is on the wall of station. It is situated near the first car stop towards the Shchyolkovskaya station just under the last ventilation lattice. It consists of two dates, divided by hyphen:

19 14/XI 46 – 19 15/XII 54

These dates translate to 14 November 1946 – 15 December 1954. The way of writing is very similar to the way dates are written on gravestones. The origin of that artifact is unknown.

References

External links
metro.ru
mymetro.ru
KartaMetro.info – Station location and exits on Moscow map (English/Russian)

Moscow Metro stations
Railway stations in Russia opened in 1944
Art Deco railway stations
Arbatsko-Pokrovskaya Line
Railway stations located underground in Russia
Cultural heritage monuments of regional significance in Moscow